Neophilippiana is a genus of crane fly in the family Limoniidae.

Distribution
Argentina & Chile

Species
N. egregia (Alexander, 1929)

References

Limoniidae
Diptera of South America